Babaleshwar is a taluka place in the southern state of Karnataka, India. It is located in the Bijapur Taluka of Bijapur district in Karnataka. It is 22 km from the district headquarters, the city of Bijapur.

Demographics

 India census, Babaleshwar had a population of 10,645 out of which 5,405 are males and 5,240 are females.

As per the Population Census 2011, there are total 2,133 families residing in the village Babaleshwar. The total population of Babaleshwar is 10,645 out of which 5,405 are males and 5,240 are females thus the Average Sex Ratio of Babaleshwar is 969.

The population of Children of age 0-6 years in Babaleshwar village is 1443 which is 14% of the total population. There are 761 male children and 682 female children between the age 0-6 years. Thus as per the Census 2011 the Child Sex Ratio of Babaleshwar is 896 which is less than Average Sex Ratio (969) of Babaleshwar village.

As per the Census 2011, the literacy rate of Babaleshwar is 65.9%. Thus Babaleshwar village has higher literacy rate compared to 57.3% of Bijapur district. The male literacy rate is 74.78% and the female literacy rate is 56.78% in Babaleshwar village.

Agriculture

The village mainly grows sugarcane, grapes, pomegranates, maize, and sorghum (jawar), as well as small amounts of lemons, onions, and turmeric. Irrigation occurs via water canals and wells.

Economy

Farming and agriculture related business is the main occupation for many people in the village.
The cropping pattern in the village reveals that food crops like jowar, maize, bajra and wheat among cereals, red gram, Bengal gram and green gram among pulses are major crops cultivated in the village. The major oilseed crops are sunflower, groundnut and safflower. Horticulture crops like grapes, pomegranate, ber, guava sapota, lime are also grown.

Temples

The village has several temples,

 Shree Hanuman Temple
 Shree Nadadevi Temple
 Shree Mahalaxshmi Temple
 Shree Pandurang Temple
 Shree Gurupadeshwar Math
 Shree Virabhreshwar Temple
Shree Siddarameshwar Temple
Shree Amblisiddashwar Temple
 shree kusappayya Temple
 Renuka yellamma temple
 Maling rai temple. 

Village has two shaiva temples belonging to twelfth century built by Chalukyas of Badami. Both Siddarameshwar and Ambalisiddeshwar temple were built by Adilshahis of Vijayapur. Shri Gurupadeshwar Math is Brahanmatha and comes under as 34th shakha of Rambhapuri Peetha of Balehonnur of Chikkamagalur district.

Mosques

Mosques and Maszid exist for the Muslim community. There is a Moharam every year, and Uras festivals are celebrated by both Hindu and Muslim religion.

Trusts

In village there are some associations doing cultural, sports programmes and other activities.

Babaleshwar Belaku Snehitara Koota Trust (R), Bengaluru is one of the trusts based out of Bengaluru. he group’s motto is to get everyone from Babaleshwar together as one family and work as one team to achieve the short term and long term goals which really matter to one and all for the better human beings, individual growth, union growth and contribution back to home town to see all possible development. People working outside Babaleshwar, who belong to various fields like government sector, private sectors, business etc., have come forward and shown the interest in connecting the people with constructive minds for the better welfare while everybody breaths the culture of native, preserve the values of tradition.

Transportation

NH-55 is passing through babaleshwar from Bijapur to Dharawad via Jamakhandi. And also connected many villages near to babaleshwar.

Education

In the village, there are several schools and colleges. The main schools among them are as listed below

 HPS(Boys), Babaleshwar
 HPS(Girls), Babaleshwar
 HPS(Urdu), Babaleshwar
 Danammadevi LPS, Babaleshwar
 SGSSJ LPS, Babaleshwar

 Sharada Vidaynikethan LPS, Babaleshwar
 Shri Janaki Vidya Mandir HPS, Babaleshwar
 Bapuji HPS, Babaleshwar

 Govt High School(Urdu), Babaleshwar
 Shantaveer High School, Babaleshwar
 Bapuji High School, Babaleshwar

 Shantaveer Pre-University College, Babaleshwar
 Govt ITI College, Babaleshwar
 Shantaveer Arts College, Babaleshwar

 Indira Gandhi Residential School, Babaleshwar

Literature

Shankargouda Gurugouda Biradar popularly known as Father of Kannada nursery rhymes.

Born on 19 May 1926, at Babaleshwar village of Bijapur taluk, Biradar opted to become a schoolteacher. However, he had a passion for writing for children.

Several of his contemporary writers believe that Biradar wanted to popularise rhymes among children in the most simplified form, ensuring that each rhyme carries a message for society and children.

"We have grown listening and singing rhymes written by him. During the 1970s, his poems were so popular among children that the government had included several of them in textbooks. All India Radio would broadcast his poems and everyone would listen with great interest," said Mallikarjun Yendigeri, president of the district unit of the Kannada Sahitya Parishat. He said Biradar was one of the few activists who fought for Kannada in Karnataka. He had actively participated in the Gokak agitation, Mr. Yendigeri said.

Biradar, who authored 25 books and numerous poems, served as president of the Kannada Sahitya Parishat, president of Makkala Sahitya Sangama, and was district vice-president of Kannada Kriya Samiti of the Gokak agitation.

Biradar was honoured by the State and the Union governments for his contribution to children’s literature.

He received the Best Teacher Award in 1980 from the then President Neelam Sanjiva Reddy.

Shankargouda Gurugouda Biradar, fondly known as Shan. Gu. Biradar, is a household name in Bijapur district for pioneering nursery rhymes in Kannada and leaving behind a legacy of children’s literature. The veteran writer, who died here on 6 July at the age of 87, was known for his simple, yet effective, writings for children; may it be poems, rhymes, or plays.

Literacy Rate

As per the Census 2011, the literacy rate of Babaleshwar is 65.9%. Thus Babaleshwar village has higher literacy rate compared to 57.3% of Bijapur district. The male literacy rate is 74.78% and the female literacy rate is 56.78% in Babaleshwar village.

Festivals

Annual festivals exist celebrating Shri Hari Pandurang Vittal Saptaha (Dindhi) as well as Kara Hunnume, Nagara Panchami, Deepavli, Ugadi, Dassara, Ganaradane, Shri Shantaveer Kumba Abisheka, Yellamma Jathra, Kusaup Temple Jhatra and Maddi Yellamma Temple Jathra.

Politics

Babaleshwar village is Assembly Constituency of Vijayapur District.

Dr M B Patil former irrigation and home minister is from Babaleshwar constituency.

PKPS

 Primary Agricultural  Co-operative Society(PKPS), Babaleshwar

Veterinary Hospital

 Veterinary Hospital, Babaleshwar

Agricultural Market

 APMC Agricultural Market, Babaleshwar

Health

 Primary HealthCare Center, Babaleshwar

Electric Transition Center

 110 KV and 33 KV Electric Transition Center, Babaleshwar

Police Station

 Police Station, Babaleshwar

Rain Measurement Center

 Rain Measurement Center, Babaleshwar

Village Panchayat

 Village Panchayat, Babaleshwar

Village Panchayat Library

 Village Panchayat Library, Babaleshwar

Revenue Office

 Revenue Office, Babaleshwar

Hostel

 BCM Hostel, Babaleshwar

Nandini KMF

 Milk Production Cooperative Society, Babaleshwar

Industrial Area

 Industrial Area, Babaleshwar

Bus Station

 Govt Bus Station, Babaleshwar

Fair

 Weekly village fair on every friday.

Lake

 Lake, Babaleshwar

Telephone Exchange Center

 Telephone Exchange Center, Babaleshwar
 STC Code - 08355

Post Office

 Post Office, Babaleshwar
 PINCode-586113
The following branch post offices come under Babaleshwar Sub Post Office
01.Arjunagi 
02.Bellubbi
03.Chikkalaki
04.Hebbalatti 
05.Hokkundi
06.Hosur
07.Jainapur 
08.Jambagi
09.Kakhandaki 
10.Kanabur
11.Kumathe
12..Mamadapur
13.Nagaral
14.Nidoni
15.Shirabur
16.Tiganibidari
17.Uppaladinni 
18.Yakkundi

Transportation

Village is well connected to district headquarter Vijayapur also Galagali and Jamakhandi.

Highway

 State Highway - 55 => Babaleshwar - Kambagi - Gunadal - Galagali (Kanabur)

Climate and Temperature

Village has a semi-arid climate. It has an average elevation of 606 metres (1988 ft).

The climate is generally dry and healthy. In summer, especially in April and May it is too hot; at that time the temperature lays between 40 degree Celsius to 42 degree Celsius. In winter season, from November to January the temperature is between 20 degree Celsius to 30 degree Celsius. Usually the district has dry weather, so the humidity varies from 10% to 30%.

See also

 Bijapur district, Karnataka
 Districts of Karnataka

References

External links
 

Villages in Bijapur district, Karnataka